Miss Universe Spain 2018 was the sixth edition of the Miss Universe Spain pageant. It was held in August Auditorium, Palau Firal i de Congressos in Tarragona on June 29, 2018, with 20 finalists competing. Sofía del Prado of Castilla-La Mancha crowned her successor at the end of the event. The winner represented Spain at Miss Universe 2018 pageant. Ángela Ponce became the first trans woman  to win the competition.

The event was broadcast live and direct nationally by the forty-two regional television stations that make up the Cadena Local TV group and also via Broadcasting through the official channel on YouTube for viewers around the world.

Results

Placements

Candidates 
20 contestants competed for the title of Miss Universe Spain 2018:

References

External links

Universe Spain
Miss Spain
June 2018 events in Spain
2018 in Catalonia